The Tampa Bay Rays 2015 season was the Rays' 18th season of Major League Baseball and the eighth as the "Rays" (all at Tropicana Field)

Offseason

November 3: Designated Vince Belnome and Jerry Sands for assignment.
November 4: Signed Eduar Quinonez to a minor league contract.
November 5: Traded Cesar Ramos to the Los Angeles Angels for Mark Sappington.
November 14: Traded Jeremy Hellickson to the Arizona Diamondbacks for Andrew Velazquez and Justin Williams.
November 20: Traded Adam Liberatore and Joel Peralta to the Los Angeles Dodgers for Greg Harris and José Domínguez, promoted 5 players from the minors, invited 2 players to spring training, and designated Michael Kohn for assignment.
November 24: Released Jose Molina and Cole Figueroa.
November 25: Signed Marlon Constante to a minor league contract.
November 26: Signed Ernesto Frieri and Thomas Lebron (minor league contract).
December 1: Traded Sean Rodriguez to the Pittsburgh Pirates for Buddy Borden and cash.
December 2: Signed Ender Gonzalez to a minor league contract.
December 12: Signed 4 players to a minor league contract and invited 3 of them to spring training.
December 16: Traded Matt Joyce to the Angels for Kevin Jepsen.
December 17: Signed Jhan Mariñez to a minor league contract.
December 19: Traded Wil Myers, Ryan Hanigan, and Jose Castillo to the San Diego Padres for René Rivera, Burch Smith, and Jake Bauers. Also received Steven Souza and Travis Ott from the Washington Nationals.
December 23: Sent Brandon Gomes to the minors.
January 3: Signed Joey Butler and Juan Francisco to a minor league contract and invited them to spring training.
January 5: Signed Mayo Acosta to a minor league contract and invited him to spring training.
January 10: Signed Asdrúbal Cabrera and traded Ben Zobrist and Yunel Escobar to the Oakland Athletics for Boog Powell, Daniel Robertson, John Jaso, and cash.January 16: Signed Everett Teaford to a minor league contract and invited him to spring training.January 21: Signed Robert Zarate to a minor league contract and invited him to spring training.January 23: Received Mike Marjama from the Chicago White Sox for a player to be named later.February 2: Invited 7 players to spring training and signed 2 of them to a minor league contract.

Season standings

American League East

American League Wild Card

Record against opponents

Game log

|- bgcolor="ffbbbb"
| 1 || April 6 || Orioles || 2–6 || Tillman (1–0) || Archer (0–1) || — || 31,042 || 0–1 || 
|- bgcolor="ffbbbb"
| 2 || April 7 || Orioles || 5–6 || Gausman (1–0) || Karns (0–1) || Britton (1) || 13,906 || 0–2 || 
|- bgcolor="bbffbb"
| 3 || April 8 || Orioles || 2–0 || Odorizzi (1–0) || González (0–1) || Boxberger (1) || 13,569 || 1–2 || 
|- bgcolor="ffbbbb"
| 4 || April 10 || @ Marlins || 9–10 (10) || Morris (1–0) || Boxberger (0–1) || — || 17,375 || 1–3 || 
|- bgcolor="bbffbb"
| 5 || April 11 || @ Marlins || 2–0 || Archer (1–1) || Cosart (0–1) || Boxberger (2) || 17,830 || 2–3 || 
|- bgcolor="bbffbb"
| 6 || April 12 || @ Marlins || 8–5 || Karns (1–1) || Álvarez (0–2) || Frieri (1) || 20,199 || 3–3 || 
|- bgcolor="bbffbb"
| 7 || April 13 || @ Blue Jays || 2–1 || Odorizzi (2–0) || Dickey (0–1) || Boxberger (3) || 48,414 || 4–3 || 
|- bgcolor="bbffbb"
| 8 || April 14 || @ Blue Jays || 3–2 || Geltz (1–0) || Castro (0–1) || Jepsen (1) || 17,264 || 5–3 || 
|- bgcolor="ffbbbb"
| 9 || April 15 || @ Blue Jays || 7–12 || Buehrle (2–0) || Ramírez (0–1) || — || 15,086 || 5–4 || 
|- bgcolor="bbffbb"
| 10 || April 16 || @ Blue Jays || 4–2 || Archer (2–1) || Sanchez (0–2) || Boxberger (4) || 14,433 || 6–4 ||  
|- bgcolor="ffbbbb"
| 11 || April 17 || Yankees || 4–5 || Betances (2–0) || Jepsen (0–1) || Miller (3) || 15,572 || 6–5 || 
|- bgcolor="ffbbbb"
| 12 || April 18 || Yankees || 0–9 || Tanaka (2–1) || Odorizzi (2–1) || — || 20,824 || 6–6 || 
|- bgcolor="ffbbbb"
| 13 || April 19 || Yankees || 3–5 || Pineda (2–0) || Andriese (0–1) || Miller (4) || 21,791 || 6–7 || 
|- bgcolor="ffbbbb"
| 14 || April 21 || Red Sox || 0–1 || Miley (1–1) || Archer (2–2) || Uehara (2) || 14,307 || 6–8 || 
|- bgcolor="bbffbb"
| 15 || April 22 || Red Sox || 7–5 || Boxberger (1–1) || Mujica (1–1) || Geltz (1) || 12,733 || 7–8 || 
|- bgcolor="bbffbb"
| 16 || April 23 || Red Sox || 2–1 || Boxberger (2–1)  || Varvaro (0–1) || — || 13,834 || 8–8 || 
|- bgcolor="bbffbb"
| 17 || April 24 || Blue Jays || 12–3 || Dominguez (1–0) || Dickey (0–2) || Andriese (1)  || 11,897 || 9–8 ||  
|- bgcolor="bbffbb"
| 18 || April 25 || Blue Jays || 4–2 || Frieri (1–0) || Cecil (1–2) || Boxberger (5) || 19,772 || 10–8 || 
|- bgcolor="bbffbb"
| 19 || April 26 || Blue Jays || 5–1 || Archer (3–2) || Buehrle (3–1) || — || 21,107 || 11–8 || 
|- bgcolor="ffbbbb"
| 20 || April 27 || @ Yankees || 1–4 || Wilson (1–0) || Gomes (0–1)  || Miller (8) || 34,590 || 11–9 || 
|- bgcolor="ffbbbb"
| 21 || April 28 || @ Yankees || 2–4 || Whitley (1–0) || Odorizzi (2–2) || Martin (1) || 36,934 || 11–10 || 
|- bgcolor="bbffbb"
| 22 || April 29 || @ Yankees || 3–2 (13) || Gomes (1–1) || Shreve (1–1) || Frieri (2) || 30,055 || 12–10 || 
|-

|- bgcolor="bbffbb"
| 23 || May 1 || @ Orioles || 2–0 || Colomé (1–0) || Tillman (2–3) || Boxberger (6) || 9,945 || 13–10 || 
|- bgcolor="ffbbbb"
| 24 || May 2 || @ Orioles || 0–4 || González (3–1) || Archer (3–3) || Brach (1) || 12,789 || 13–11 || 
|- bgcolor="ffbbbb"
| 25 || May 3 || @ Orioles || 2–4 || Hunter (1–1) || Geltz (1–1) || Britton (5) || 16,652 || 13–12 || 
|- bgcolor="bbffbb"
| 26 || May 4 || @ Red Sox || 5–1 || Odorizzi (3–2) || Buchholz (1–4) || — || 34,541 || 14–12 || 
|- bgcolor="ffbbbb"
| 27 || May 5 || @ Red Sox || 0–2 || Porcello (3–2) || Smyly (0–1) || Uehara (5) || 33,688 || 14–13 || 
|- bgcolor="bbffbb"
| 28 || May 6 || @ Red Sox || 5–3 || Colomé (2–0) || Masterson (2–1) || Boxberger (7) || 35,060 || 15–13 || 
|- bgcolor="ffcccc"
| 29 || May 7 || Rangers || 4–5 || Claudio (1–0) || Archer (3–4) || Feliz (4) || 8,701 || 15–14 || 
|- bgcolor="ccffcc"
| 30 || May 8 || Rangers || 8–2 || Karns (2–1) || Gallardo (2–5) || — || 11,704 || 16–14 || 
|- bgcolor="ccffcc"
| 31 || May 9 || Rangers || 7–2 || Bellatti (1–0) || Detwiler (0–4) || Boxberger (8) || 20,943 || 17–14 || 
|- bgcolor="ffcccc"
| 32 || May 10 || Rangers || 1–2 || Kela (3–1) || Jepsen (0–2) || Feliz (5) || 14,521 || 17–15 || 
|- bgcolor="ffcccc"
| 33 || May 11 || Yankees || 5–11 || Sabathia (1–5) || Colomé (2–1) || — || 10,619 || 17–16 || 
|- bgcolor="ccffcc"
| 34 || May 12 || Yankees || 4–2 || Jepsen (1–2) || Eovaldi (3–1) || Boxberger (9) || 10,417 || 18–16 || 
|- bgcolor="ccffcc"
| 35 || May 13 || Yankees || 3–2 || Karns (3–1) || Warren (2–2) || Boxberger (10) || 11,924 || 18–16 || 
|- bgcolor="ccffcc"
| 36 || May 14 || Yankees || 6–1 || Ramírez (1–1) || Whitley (1–2) || Andriese (2) || 11,977 || 19–16 || 
|- bgcolor="ffcccc"
| 37 || May 15 || @ Twins || 2–3 || Hughes (3–4) || Odorizzi (3–3) || Perkins (12) || 24,018 || 20–17 || 
|- bgcolor="ffcccc"
| 38 || May 16 || @ Twins || 4–6 || Duensing (1–0) || Jepsen (1–3) || Perkins (13) || 27,128 || 20–18 || 
|- bgcolor="ccffcc"
| 39 || May 17 || @ Twins || 11–3 || Archer (4–4) || Gibson (3–3) || — || 23,708 || 21–18 || 
|- bgcolor="ccffcc"
| 40 || May 19 || @ Braves || 5–3 || Ramírez (2–1) || Foltynewicz (2–1) || Boxberger (11) || 20,120 || 22–18 || 
|- bgcolor="ffcccc"
| 41 || May 20 || @ Braves || 1–2 || Cunniff (2–0) || Odorizzi (3–4) || Grilli (12) || 24,549 || 22–19 || 
|- bgcolor="ccffcc"
| 42 || May 21 || Athletics || 3–0 || Colomé (3–1) || Chavez (1–4) || Boxberger (12) || 10,605 || 23–19 || 
|- bgcolor="ccffcc"
| 43 || May 22 || Athletics || 5–2 || Archer (5–4) || Kazmir (2–3) || Boxberger (13) || 12,329 || 24–19 || 
|- bgcolor="ffcccc"
| 44 || May 23 || Athletics || 0–5 || Graveman (2–2) || Karns (3–2) || — || 15,207 || 24–20 || 
|- bgcolor="ffcccc"
| 45 || May 24 || Athletics || 2–7 || Gray (5–2) || Ramírez (2–2) || — || 15,692 || 24–21 || 
|- bgcolor="ffcccc"
| 46 || May 25 || Mariners || 1–4 || Elías (2–1) || Odorizzi (3–5) || Rodney (13) || 10,401 || 24–22 || 
|- bgcolor="ffcccc"
| 47 || May 26 || Mariners || 6–7 || Rodney (2–2) || Boxberger (2–2) || Beimel (1) || 9,628 || 24–23 || 
|- bgcolor="ffcccc"
| 48 || May 27 || Mariners || 0–3 || Hernández (8–1) || Boxberger (2–3) || — || 10,365 || 24–24 || 
|- bgcolor="ffcccc"
| 49 || May 29 || @ Orioles || 1–2 || O'Day (1–0) || Gomes (1–2) || — || 45,505 || 24–25 || 
|- bgcolor="ccffcc"
| 50 || May 30 || @ Orioles || 3–0 || Ramírez (3–2) || Chen (1–4) || Boxberger (14) || 38,177 || 25–25 || 
|- bgcolor="ccffcc"
| 51 || May 31 || @ Orioles || 9–5 || Odorizzi (4–5) || Tillman (2–7) || Boxberger (15) || 36,945 || 26–25 || 
|-

|- bgcolor="ffcccc"
| 52 || June 1 || @ Angels || 3–7 || Richards (5–3) || Colomé (3–2) || — || 27,078 || 26–26 || 
|- bgcolor="ccffcc"
| 53 || June 2 || @ Angels || 6–1 || Archer (6–4) || Wilson (3–4) || — || 28,771 || 27–26 || 
|- bgcolor="ccffcc"
| 54 || June 3 || @ Angels || 6–5 (10) || Boxberger (3–3) || Street (2–2) || Geltz (2) || 28,245 || 28–26 || 
|- bgcolor="ccffcc"
| 55 || June 4 || @ Mariners || 2–1 || Ramírez (4–2) || Elías (2–3) || Jepsen (2) || 16,096 || 29–26 || 
|- bgcolor="ccffcc"
| 56 || June 5 || @ Mariners || 1–0 || Bellatti (2–0) || Rodney (2–3) || Jepsen (3) || 20,695 || 30–26 || 
|- bgcolor="ffcccc"
| 57 || June 6 || @ Mariners || 1–2 || Hernández (9–2) || Geltz (1–2) || Smith (1) || 31,106 || 30–27 || 
|- bgcolor="ccffcc"
| 58 || June 7 || @ Mariners || 3–1 || Archer (7–4) || Montgomery (0–1) || Jepsen (4) || 27,906 || 31–27 || 
|- bgcolor="ffcccc"
| 59 || June 9 || Angels || 2–8 || Shoemaker (4–4) || Karns (3–3) || — || 11,617 || 31–28 || 
|- bgcolor="ccffcc"
| 60 || June 10 || Angels || 4–2 || Ramírez (5–2) || Weaver (4–6) || McGee (1) || 10,088 || 32–28 || 
|- bgcolor="ffcccc"
| 61 || June 11 || Angels || 2–6 || Richards (6–4) || Jepsen (1–4) || — || 10,779 || 32–29 || 
|- bgcolor="ccffcc"
| 62 || June 12 || White Sox || 7–5 || Andriese (1–1) || Danks (3–3) || McGee (2) || 13,448 || 33–29 || 
|- bgcolor="ccffcc"
| 63 || June 13 || White Sox || 5–4 || Boxberger (4–3) || Putnam (1–2) || McGee (3) || 20,248 || 34–29 || 
|- bgcolor="ccffcc"
| 64 || June 14 || White Sox || 2–1 || Riefenhauser (1–0) || Sale (6–3) || Jepsen (5) || 17,962 || 35–29 || 
|- bgcolor="ccffcc"
| 65 || June 15 || Nationals || 6–1 || Ramírez (6–2) || González (4–4) || — || 10,216 || 36–29 || 
|- bgcolor="ffcccc"
| 66 || June 16 || Nationals || 4–16 || Roark (3–2) || Colomé (3–3) || — || 11,491 || 36–30 || 
|- bgcolor="ccffcc"
| 67 || June 17 || @ Nationals || 5–0 || Andriese (2–1) || Zimmerman (5–5) || — || 28,929 || 37–30 || 
|- bgcolor="ccffcc"
| 68 || June 18 || @ Nationals || 5–3 || Archer (8–4) || Fister (2–3) || Boxberger (16) || 29,242 || 38–30 || 
|- bgcolor="ccffcc"
| 69 || June 19 || @ Indians || 4–1 || Karns (4–3) || Carrasco (8–6) || Boxberger (17) || 22,811 || 39–30 || 
|- bgcolor="ccffcc"
| 70 || June 20 || @ Indians || 4–1 || Cedeño (1–0) || Kluber (3–9) || Boxberger (18) || 24,670 || 40–30 || 
|- bgcolor="ffcccc"
| 71 || June 21 || @ Indians || 0–1 || Allen (1–2) || Jepsen (1–5) || — || 20,847 || 40–31 || 
|- bgcolor="ffcccc"
| 72 || June 22 || Blue Jays || 5–8 || Hutchison (7–1) || Andriese (2–2) || Osuna (1) || 10,324 || 40–32 || 
|- bgcolor="ccffcc"
| 73 || June 23 || Blue Jays || 4–3 || Archer (9–4) || Dickey (3–7) || Boxberger (19) || 11,474 || 41–32 || 
|- bgcolor="ffcccc"
| 74 || June 24 || Blue Jays || 0–1 (12) || Cecil (2–4) || Gomes (1–3) || Delabar (1) || 18,469 || 41–33 || 
|- bgcolor="ffcccc"
| 75 || June 26 || Red Sox || 3–4 (10) || Ogando (2–0) || Geltz (1–3) || Uehara (15) || 17,508 || 41–34 || 
|- bgcolor="ccffcc"
| 76 || June 27 || Red Sox || 4–1 || Andriese (3–2) || Miley (7–7) || Boxberger (20) || 23,876 || 42–34 || 
|- bgcolor="ffcccc"
| 77 || June 28 || Red Sox || 3–5 || Masterson (3–2) || Archer (9–5) || Uehara (16) || 21,963 || 42–35 || 
|- bgcolor="ffcccc"
| 78 || June 29 || Indians || 1–7 || Anderson (1–0) || Karns (4–4) || — || 11,802 || 42–36 || 
|- bgcolor="ffcccc"
| 79 || June 30 || Indians || 2–6 || Salazar (7–3) || Ramírez (6–3) || — || 10,437 || 42–37 || 
|-

|- bgcolor="ffcccc"
| 80 || July 1 || Indians || 1–8 || Carrasco (10–6) || Colomé (3–4) || — || 11,394 || 42–38 || 
|- bgcolor="ffcccc"
| 81 || July 2 || Indians || 4–5 (10) || Shaw (1–1) || Cedeño (1–1) || Allen (15) || 16,353 || 42–39 || 
|- bgcolor="ffcccc"
| 82 || July 3 || @ Yankees || 5–7 (12) || Shreve (6–1) || Geltz (1–4) || — || 43,141 || 42–40 || 
|- bgcolor="ffcccc"
| 83 || July 4 || @ Yankees || 2–3 || Betances (5–1) || Boxberger (4–4) || — || 35,508 || 42–41 || 
|- bgcolor="ccffcc"
| 84 || July 5 || @ Yankees || 8–1 || Ramírez (7–3) || Nova (1–2) || — || 35,050 || 43–41 || 
|- bgcolor="bbbbbb"
| — || July 6 || @ Royals || colspan=7|Postponed (rain); Makeup: July 7
|- bgcolor="ffcccc"
| 85 || July 7 (1) || @ Royals || 5–9 || Holland (3–0) || Boxberger (4–5) || — || 22,386 || 43–42 || 
|- bgcolor="ffcccc"
| 86 || July 7 (2)  || @ Royals || 1–7 || Finnegan (2–0) || Gomes (1–4) || — || 28,119 || 43–43 || 
|- bgcolor="ffcccc"
| 87 || July 8 || @ Royals || 7–9 || Guthrie (7–5) || Archer (9–6) || Holland (17) || 28,204 || 43–44 || 
|- bgcolor="ffcccc"
| 88 || July 9 || @ Royals || 3–8 || Ventura (4–6) || Karns (4–5) || — || 32,308 || 43–45 || 
|- bgcolor="ccffcc"
| 89 || July 10 || Astros || 3–1 || Ramírez (8–3) || McHugh (9–5) || Boxberger (21) || 17,129 || 44–45 || 
|- bgcolor="ccffcc"
| 90 || July 11 || Astros || 3–0 || Odorizzi (5–5) || Keuchel (11–4) || Boxberger (22) || 18,479 || 45–45 || 
|- bgcolor="ccffcc"
| 91 || July 12 || Astros || 4–3 || Moore (1–0) || McCullers (4–5) || Boxberger (23) || 16,458 || 46–45 || 
|- bgcolor=#bbcaff
| – || July 14 ||86th All-Star Game || AL 6–3 NL || Price (1–0) || Kershaw (0–1) || — || 43,656 || — || Box
|- bgcolor="ffcccc"
| 92 || July 17 || @ Blue Jays || 2–6 || Hutchison (9–2) || Odorizzi (5–6) || — || 32,908 || 46–46 || 
|- bgcolor="ccffcc"
| 93 || July 18 || @ Blue Jays || 3–2 || Jepsen (2–5) || Tepera (0–1) || McGee (4) || 41,583 || 47–46 || 
|- bgcolor="ffcccc"
| 94 || July 19 || @ Blue Jays || 0–4 || Estrada (7–5) || Archer (9–7) || — || 41,683 || 47–47 || 
|- bgcolor="ffcccc"
| 95 || July 20 || @ Phillies || 3–5 || Buchanan (1–5) || Moore (1–1) || Papelbon (16) || 20,148 || 47–48 || 
|- bgcolor="ccffcc"
| 96 || July 21 || @ Phillies || 1–0 || Karns (5–5) || Nola (0–1) || Boxberger (24) || 28,703 || 48–48 || 
|- bgcolor="ffcccc"
| 97 || July 22 || @ Phillies || 4–5 (10) || Papelbon (2–1) || Boxberger (2–6) || — || 22,252 || 48–49 || 
|- bgcolor="ccffcc"
| 98 || July 24 || Orioles || 3–1 || Colomé (4–4) || O'Day (5–1) || McGee (5) || 17,838 || 49–49 || 
|- bgcolor="ffcccc"
| 99 || July 25 || Orioles || 1–5 || González (9–6) || Ramírez (8–4) || — || 24,327 || 49–50 || 
|- bgcolor="ffcccc"
| 100 || July 26 || Orioles || 2–5 || Chen (5–6) || Moore (1–2) || Britton (25) || 18,613 || 49–51 || 
|- bgcolor="ccffcc"
| 101 || July 27 || Tigers || 5–2 || Karns (6–5) || Sánchez (10–8) || Boxberger (25) || 13,348  || 50–51 || 
|- bgcolor="ccffcc"
| 102 || July 28 || Tigers || 10–2 || Odorizzi (6–6) || Price (9–4) || — || 16,326 || 51–51 || 
|- bgcolor="ffcccc"
| 103 || July 29 || Tigers || 1–2 || Verlander (1–3) || Archer (9–8) || Soria (23) || 28,057 || 51–52 || 
|- bgcolor="ffcccc"
| 104 || July 31 || @ Red Sox || 5–7 || Tazawa (2–3) || McGee (0–1) || Uehara (23) || 36,715 || 51–53 || 
|-

|- bgcolor="ffcccc"
| 105 || August 1 || @ Red Sox || 7–11 || Kelly (3–6) || Moore (1–3) || Machi (1) || 35,944 || 51–54 || 
|- bgcolor="ccffcc"
| 106 || August 2 || @ Red Sox || 4–3 || Geltz (2–4) || Tazawa (2–4) || Boxberger (26) || 35,699 || 52–54 || 
|- bgcolor="ccffcc"
| 107 || August 3 || @ White Sox || 5–4 || McGee (1–1) || Robertson (4–3) || Boxberger (27) || 16,496 || 53–54 || 
|- bgcolor="ccffcc"
| 108 || August 4 || @ White Sox || 11–3 || Archer (10–8) || Sale (9–7) || — || 18,499 || 54–54 || 
|- bgcolor="ffcccc"
| 109 || August 5 || @ White Sox || 5–6 (10) || Robertson (5–3) || Boxberger (4–7) || — || 20,028 || 54–55 || 
|- bgcolor="ffcccc"
| 110 || August 7 || Mets || 3–4 || Clippard (2–3) || Boxberger (4–8) || Familia (30) || 23,145 || 54–56 || 
|- bgcolor="ccffcc"
| 111 || August 8 || Mets || 5–4 || Karns (7–5) || Syndergaard (6–6) || Boxberger (28) || 31,042 || 55–56 || 
|- bgcolor="ccffcc"
| 112 || August 9 || Mets || 4–3 || Cedeño (2–1) || Colón (10–11) || McGee (6) || 26,681 || 56–56 || 
|- bgcolor="ccffcc"
| 113 || August 11 || Braves || 2–0 || Ramírez (9–4) || Pérez (4–3) || Cedeño (1) || 15,506 || 57–56 || 
|- bgcolor="ccffcc"
| 114 || August 12 || Braves || 9–6 || Colomé (5–4) || Marksberry (0–1) || Boxberger (29) || 16,337 || 58–56 || 
|- bgcolor="ffcccc"
| 115 || August 14 || @ Rangers || 3–5 || Dyson (4–4) || McGee (1–2) || Tolleson (22) || 32,512 || 58–57 || 
|- bgcolor="ffcccc"
| 116 || August 15 || @ Rangers || 4–12 || Lewis (13–5) || Archer (10–9) || — || 32,351 || 58–58 || 
|- bgcolor="ffcccc"
| 117 || August 16 || @ Rangers || 3–5 || Gallardo (9–9) || Smyly (0–2) || Tolleson (23) || 29,167 || 58–59 || 
|- bgcolor="ccffcc"
| 118 || August 17 || @ Astros || 9–2 || Ramírez (10–4) || Kazmir (6–8) || — || 16,256 || 59–59 || 
|- bgcolor="ffcccc"
| 119 || August 18 || @ Astros || 2–3 (10) || Gregerson (6–2) || Boxberger (4–9) || — || 17,749 || 59–60 || 
|- bgcolor="ffcccc"
| 120 || August 19 || @ Astros || 2–3 (13) || Fields (4–1) || Andriese (3–3) || — || 26,001 || 59–61 || 
|- bgcolor="ccffcc"
| 121 || August 20 || @ Astros || 1–0 || Archer (11–9) || McHugh (13–7) || — || 18,177 || 60–61 || 
|- bgcolor="ccffcc"
| 122 || August 21 || @ Athletics || 2–1 || Smyly (1–2) || Bassitt (1–5) || Boxberger (30) || 20,671 || 61–61 || 
|- bgcolor="ccffcc"
| 123 || August 22 || @ Athletics || 5–4 || Colomé (6–4) || Venditte (0–2) || — || 35,067 || 62–61 || 
|- bgcolor="ffcccc"
| 124 || August 23 || @ Athletics || 2–8 || Rodriguez (3–1) || Geltz (2–5) || — || 19,425 || 62–62 || 
|- bgcolor="ffcccc"
| 125 || August 25 || Twins || 7–11 || Graham (1–1) || Andriese (3–4) || — || 9,632 || 62–63 || 
|- bgcolor="ffcccc"
| 126 || August 26 || Twins || 3–5 || Duensing (4–0) || Archer (11–10) || Jepsen (8) || 9,205 || 62–64 || 
|- bgcolor="ccffcc"
| 127 || August 27 || Twins || 5–4 || Gomes (2–4) || Milone (6–4) || Boxberger (31) || 9,375 || 63–64 || 
|- bgcolor="ffcccc"
| 128 || August 28 || Royals || 2–3 || Vólquez (12–7) || Ramírez (10–5) || Holland (29) || 13,622 || 63–65 || 
|- bgcolor="ffcccc"
| 129 || August 29 || Royals || 3–6 || Medlen (3–0) || Odorizzi (6–7) || Davis (13) || 24,372 || 63–66 || 
|- bgcolor="ccffcc"
| 130 || August 30 || Royals || 3–2 || Cedeño (3–1) || Hochevar (1–1) || Boxberger (32) || 18,634 || 64–66 || 
|- bgcolor="ccffcc"
| 131 || August 31 || @ Orioles || 6–3 || Archer (12–10) || Chen (8–7) || Boxberger (33) || 19,841 || 65–66 || 
|-

|- bgcolor="ccffcc"
| 132 || September 1 || @ Orioles || 11–2 || Smyly (2–2) || Tillman (9–10) || — || 22,987 || 66–66 || 
|- bgcolor="ffcccc"
| 133 || September 2 || @ Orioles || 6–7 (11) || Brach (5–2) || Andriese (3–5) || — || 15,963 || 66–67 || 
|- bgcolor="ffcccc"
| 134 || September 4 || @ Yankees || 2–5 || Severino (3–2) || Odorizzi (6–8) || Miller (30) || 32,530 || 66–68 || 
|- bgcolor="ccffcc"
| 135 || September 5 || @ Yankees || 3–2 || Cedeño (4–1) || Eovaldi (13–4) || Boxberger (34) || 35,030 || 67–68 || 
|- bgcolor="ffcccc"
| 136 || September 6 || @ Yankees || 4–6 || Nova (6–7) || Archer (12–11) || Miller (31) || 35,299 || 67–69 || 
|- bgcolor="ffcccc"
| 137 || September 7 || @ Tigers || 4–5 || Alburquerque (4–1) || Gomes (2–5) || Rondón (4) || 27,958 || 67–70 || 
|- bgcolor="ffcccc"
| 138 || September 8 || @ Tigers || 7–8 (13) || Ryan (2–3) || Bellatti (2–1) || — || 26,526 || 67–71 || 
|- bgcolor="ccffcc"
| 139 || September 9 || @ Tigers || 8–0 || Odorizzi (7–8) || Lobstein (3–7) || — || 25,932 || 68–71 || 
|- bgcolor="ccffcc"
| 140 || September 11 || Red Sox || 8–4 || Bellatti (3–1) || Tazawa (2–7) || — || 14,796 || 69–71 || 
|- bgcolor="ffcccc"
| 141 || September 12 || Red Sox || 4–10 || Porcello (8–12) || Moore (1–4) || — || 20,698 || 69–72 || 
|- bgcolor="ffcccc"
| 142 || September 13 || Red Sox || 0–2 || Hembree (1–0) || Romero (0–1) || Ross (2) || 15,402 || 69–73 || 
|- bgcolor="ffcccc"
| 143 || September 14 || Yankees || 1–4 || Cotham (1–0) || Boxberger (4–10) || Miller (33) || 11,940 || 69–74 || 
|- bgcolor="ccffcc"
| 144 || September 15 || Yankees || 6–3 || Odorizzi (8–8) || Rumbelow (1–1) || Gomes (1) || 13,539 || 70–74 || 
|- bgcolor="ffcccc"
| 145 || September 16 || Yankees || 1–3 || Severino (4–3) || Archer (12–12) || Miller (34) || 13,299 || 70–75 || 
|- bgcolor="ffcccc"
| 146 || September 17 || Orioles || 3–4 || Roe (4–2) || Colomé (6–5) || O'Day (3) || 9,617 || 70–76 || 
|- bgcolor="ccffcc"
| 147 || September 18 || Orioles || 8–6 || Smyly (3–2) || Wilson (2–2) || Boxberger (35) || 10,967 || 71–76 || 
|- bgcolor="ffcccc"
| 148 || September 19 || Orioles || 1–2 || Chen (10–7) || Ramírez (10–6) || Britton (34) || 17,053 || 71–77 || 
|- bgcolor="ccffcc"
| 149 || September 20 || Orioles || 7–6 || Yates (1–0) || Britton (4–1) || — || 17,801 || 72–77 || 
|- bgcolor="ffcccc"
| 150 || September 21 || @ Red Sox || 7–8 || Machi (2–0) || Gomes (2–6) || Ross (5) || 33,673 || 72–78 || 
|- bgcolor="ccffcc"
| 151 || September 22 || @ Red Sox || 5–2 || Moore (2–4) || Koehler (3–3) || Boxberger (36) || 33,673 || 73–78 || 
|- bgcolor="ccffcc"
| 152 || September 23 || @ Red Sox || 6–2 || Smyly (4–2) || Porcello (8–14) || Boxberger (37) || 32,753 || 74–78 || 
|- bgcolor="ccffcc"
| 153 || September 24 || @ Red Sox || 4–2 || Ramírez (11–6) || Miley (11–11) || Boxberger (38) || 34,916 || 75–78 || 
|- bgcolor="ffcccc"
| 154 || September 25 || @ Blue Jays || 3–5 || Dickey (11–11) || Odorizzi (8–9) || Osuna (18) || 47,696 || 75–79 || 
|- bgcolor="ffcccc"
| 155 || September 26 || @ Blue Jays || 8–10 || Price (18–5) || Archer (12–13) || Osuna (19) || 47,094 || 75–80 || 
|- bgcolor="ffcccc"
| 156 || September 27 || @ Blue Jays || 4–5 || Cecil (4–5) || Geltz (2–6) || — || 47,287 || 75–81 || 
|- bgcolor="ccffcc"
| 157 || September 29 || Marlins || 4–2 || Colomé (7–5) || Morris (5–4) || Boxberger (39) || 9,150 || 76–81 || 
|- bgcolor="ccffcc"
| 158 || September 30 || Marlins || 6–4 || Smyly (5–2) || Cosart (2–5) || Boxberger (40) || 9,431 || 77–81 || 
|-

|- bgcolor="ccffcc"
| 159 || October 1 || Marlins || 4–1 || Odorizzi (9–9) || Fernández (6–1) || Boxberger (41) || 9,657 || 78–81 || 
|- bgcolor="ffcccc"
| 160 || October 2 || Blue Jays || 4–8 || Buehrle (15–7) || Romero (0–2) || — || 13,668 || 78–82 || 
|- bgcolor="ccffcc"
| 161 || October 3 || Blue Jays || 4–3 || Colomé (8–5) || Osuna (1–6) || — || 21,963 || 79–82 || 
|- bgcolor="ccffcc"
| 162 || October 4 || Blue Jays || 12–3 || Moore''' (3–4) || Buehrle (15–8) || — || 15,815 || 80–82 || 
|-

|- style="text-align:center;"
| Legend:       = Win       = Loss       = PostponementBold = Rays team member Games moved to Tropicana Field for safety concerns due to the 2015 Baltimore riots.

Roster

Statistics

BattingNote: G = Games played; AB = At bats; R = Runs scored; H = Hits; 2B = Doubles; 3B = Triples; HR = Home runs; RBI = Runs batted in; BB = Base on balls; SO = Strikeouts; AVG = Batting average; SB = Stolen basesPitchingNote: W = Wins; L = Losses; ERA = Earned run average; G = Games pitched; GS = Games started; SV = Saves; IP = Innings pitched; H = Hits allowed; R = Runs allowed; ER = Earned runs allowed; HR = Home runs allowed; BB = Walks allowed; K = Strikeouts  

Farm system

LEAGUE CHAMPIONS: Charlotte

References

External links

2015 Tampa Bay Rays season Official Site 
2015 Tampa Bay Rays season at ESPN
2015 Tampa Bay Rays season at Baseball Reference''

Tampa Bay Rays season
Tampa Bay Rays
Tampa Bay Rays seasons